Scogli Porcelli Lighthouse is an active lighthouse located  offshore Trapani on a series of emerging rocks. Scogli Porcelii makes part of Aegadian Islands on the Sicily Channel.

Description
The structure is squat and massive and is unusual for the Italian lighthouses. The tower has a second balcony, all around the lantern, which can be reached by a spiral staircase lighted by three aligned windows decorated by a stone frame. The tower is unpainted stone, the lantern is white and the lantern dome is grey metallic. The lighthouse is completely automated and managed by the Marina Militare with the identification code number 3132 E.F.

See also
 List of lighthouses in Italy

References

External links

 Servizio Fari Marina Militare

Lighthouses in Italy
Buildings and structures in Sicily